

248001–248100 

|-bgcolor=#f2f2f2
| colspan=4 align=center | 
|}

248101–248200 

|-id=183
| 248183 Peisandros ||  || Peisander (Peisandros), son of Antimachos, from Greek mythology. He and his brother Hippolochos were killed by Agamemnon during the Trojan War. || 
|}

248201–248300 

|-id=262
| 248262 Liuxiaobo ||  || Liu Xiaobo (born 1955) received the 2010 Nobel Peace Prize for his long and nonviolent struggle for human rights in China. || 
|}

248301–248400 

|-id=321
| 248321 Cester ||  || Bruno Cester (1920–2017), an Italian physicist and astronomer at the Astronomical Observatory of Trieste. His research included variable stars as well as (visual) double stars. || 
|-id=388
| 248388 Namtso ||  || Namtso is a mountain lake in Tibet. It is also known as Lake Nam, Nam Co, and Tengri Nor. || 
|}

248401–248500 

|-bgcolor=#f2f2f2
| colspan=4 align=center | 
|}

248501–248600 

|-bgcolor=#f2f2f2
| colspan=4 align=center | 
|}

248601–248700 

|-bgcolor=#f2f2f2
| colspan=4 align=center | 
|}

248701–248800 

|-id=750
| 248750 Asteroidday ||  || Asteroid Day is an annual global movement that brings people from around the world together to learn about asteroids and what we can do to protect our planet from asteroid impacts. The United Nations has proclaimed that Asteroid Day will be observed globally on June 30 every year. || 
|}

248801–248900 

|-id=839
| 248839 Mazeikiai ||  || Mažeikiai is a Lithuanian city of 45,000 inhabitants, located 280 km northwest of Vilnius on the Venta River. Mazeikiai was first mentioned in 1335 and received the rights of self-government in 1919. || 
|}

248901–249000 

|-id=908
| 248908 Ginostrada ||  || Gino Strada (1948–2021), an Italian surgeon and founder of Emergency, an Italian non-governmental humanitarian organization that operates in several countries all over the world || 
|-id=970
| 248970 Giannimorandi ||  || Gianni Morandi (born 1944), an Italian singer, actor and entertainer || 
|-id=993
| 248993 Jonava ||  || Jonava, a city in central Lithuania || 
|}

References 

248001-249000